These are the full results of the 2000 NACAC Under-25 Championships in Athletics which took place between August 3 and August 5, 2000, at Universidad Autónoma de Nuevo León in Monterrey, Mexico.

Men's results

100 meters

Final – 3 August
Wind: -2.5 m/s

Heat 1 – 3 August
Wind: -0.5 m/s

Heat 2 – 3 August
Wind: -0.9 m/s

200 meters

Final – 5 August
Wind: -3.9 m/s

Heat 1 – 4 August
Wind: +0.9 m/s

Heat 2 – 4 August
Wind: +0.7 m/s

400 meters
Final – 4 August

800 meters
Final – 5 August

1500 meters
Final – 3 August

5000 meters
Final – 5 August

10,000 meters
Final – 3 August

Half marathon
Final – 5 August

3000 meters steeplechase
Final – 4 August

110 meters hurdles
Final – 5 August
Wind: -1.9 m/s

400 meters hurdles

Final – 3 August

Heat 1 – 3 August

Heat 2 – 3 August

High jump
Final – 5 August

Pole vault
Final – 5 August

Long jump
Final – 4 August

Triple jump
Final – 3 August

Shot put
Final – 3 August

Discus throw
Final – 4 August

Hammer throw
Final – 5 August

Javelin throw
Final – 3 August

Decathlon
Final – 3 August

20,000 meters walk
Final – 4 August

4x100 meters relay
Final – 4 August

4x400 meters relay
Final – 5 August

Women's results

100 meters
Final – 3 August
Wind: -1.6 m/s

200 meters
Final – 5 August
Wind: -3.1 m/s

400 meters
Final – 4 August

800 meters
Final – 5 August

1500 meters
Final – 3 August

5000 meters
Final – 5 August

10,000 meters
Final – 4 August

Half marathon
Final – 5 August

100 meters hurdles
Final – 4 August
Wind: -1.8 m/s

400 meters hurdles
Final – 3 August

High jump
Final – 4 August

Pole vault
Final – 3 August

Long jump
Final – 5 August

Triple jump
Final – 4 August

Shot put
Final – 5 August

Discus throw
Final – 3 August

Hammer throw
Final – 3 August

Javelin throw
Final – 5 August

Heptathlon
Final – 4 August

20,000 meters walk
Final – 4 August

4x100 meters relay
Final – 4 August

4x400 meters relay
Final – 5 August

References

Events at the NACAC Under-23 Championships in Athletics
NACAC U23 Championships
2000 in Mexican sports
International athletics competitions hosted by Mexico
2000 in youth sport